The Governor of Sabah (Yang di-Pertua Negeri) is the ceremonial head of state of the Malaysian state of Sabah. The Yang di-Pertua Negeri is styled Tuan Yang Terutama (TYT; "His Excellency").

The current officeholder is Juhar Mahiruddin, who was sworn in on 1 January 2011.

Appointment 
The office of the Yang di-Pertua Negeri (governor) is established by the Constitution of Sabah. According to Article 1 (1) of the Constitution, the office must exist and be appointed by the Yang di-Pertuan Agong (king) after consultation with the chief minister. Every governor is appointed for a term of four years. However, the king reserves the power to extend his term of appointment.

The governor has neither a deputy nor assistant. However, in event of his inability to govern the state due to illness, absence or any other cause, the king reserves the power to appoint a person to exercise the function of the governor.

Functions, powers and privileges 
Many functions and powers of the king – at the federal level – are delegated to the governor at the state level – like the other rulers of states. The governor, however, has no power and function towards the judiciary.

As he is the head of state, he is a member of the Conference of Rulers. He share the same power with the other members of the conference. However, he cannot be appointed as the Yang di-Pertuan Agong.

Article 10 of the Constitution describes that the governor has to act according to the Constitution and makes decisions based on the advice from the state cabinet. However, he may also act on his own discretion in certain matters.

The Constitution provides the power to the governor to appoint key officers of the state. Most of them are appointed after consultation with the chief minister, except in appointing the chief minister. The same process occurred during dismissal of an officeholder.

The Constitution also describes powers of the governor in the state legislative assembly. All bills must be assented by the governor in 30 days after a bill passed. The governor also has to address the assembly annually.

List of Yang di-Pertua Negeri 
The following is the list of Yang di-Pertua Negeri of Sabah:

Living former Yang di-Pertua Negeri 
One former Yang di-Pertua Negeri of Sabah is alive.

The most recent death of a former Yang di-Pertua Negeri was that of Sakaran Dandai (1995–2002).

See also 
 Yang di-Pertua Negeri
 Governor of North Borneo (for the Governors of the predecessing Colony of North Borneo)

References

External links 
 Yang di-Pertua Negeri at the Sabah Government official website 
 Istana Negeri Kota Kinabalu official website

 
Lists of political office-holders in Malaysia
1963 establishments in Malaysia